La Guingueta d'Àneu is a municipality in the comarca of the Pallars Sobirà in Catalonia, Spain. It is situated in the valley of the Noguera Pallaresa river below the reservoir of La Torrassa. It is linked to Sort by the C-147 road.

Subdivisions 
The municipality of la Guingueta d'Àneu is formed of thirteen villages. Populations are given as of 2005:
Berrós Jussà (24)
Burgo (7)
Cerbi (20), on the right bank of the Unarre river, at the foot of Mont-roig mountain (2864 m)
Dorve (11)
Escalarre (26), on the left bank of the Unarre river
Escaló (95), on the C-147 road
Escart (16), on the left bank of the Escart river
Estaron (16), on the slopes of the Aurati range
Gavàs (17)
La Guingueta (78)
Jou (25), in the north-east of the municipality
Llavorre (5)
Unarre (14), in the valley of the Unarre river

Demography

See also 
Sant Pere del Burgal
 Apse of Santa Maria d'Àneu, a romanesque apse of the church of Santa Maria d'Àneu, the transferred frescos from which are now exhibited at Museu Nacional d'Art de Catalunya.
 Paintings from El Burgal

References

 Panareda Clopés, Josep Maria; Rios Calvet, Jaume; Rabella Vives, Josep Maria (1989). Guia de Catalunya, Barcelona: Caixa de Catalunya.  (Spanish).  (Catalan).

External links
Official website 
 Government data pages 

Municipalities in Pallars Sobirà
Populated places in Pallars Sobirà